Anastasios Pastos (born 15 August 1978) is a retired Greek football defender.

References

1978 births
Living people
PAOK FC players
GAS Ialysos 1948 F.C. players
Apollon Smyrnis F.C. players
Doxa Katokopias FC players
Levadiakos F.C. players
Pierikos F.C. players
Ethnikos Piraeus F.C. players
Chalkida F.C. players
Super League Greece players
Association football defenders
Greek expatriate footballers
Expatriate footballers in Cyprus
Greek expatriate sportspeople in Cyprus
Footballers from Athens
Greek footballers